Raavitsa (also known as Raavitse) is a village in Valga Parish, Valga County, in southeastern Estonia. It borders the town of Valga in the west, Tartu–Valga railway in the northwest and Valga–Pechory railway in the south. Raavitsa has an unused station named "Raavitse" on Tartu–Valga line.

The centre of Valga is 5 km away, it's accessible via Tambre tee.

Raavitsa has a population of 67 (as of 1 January 2004).

References

Villages in Valga County